The Jodłówka  gas field in Poland was discovered in 1980. It began production in 1985 and produces natural gas. The total proven reserves of the Jodłówka gas field are around 106 billion cubic feet (3×109m³).

References

Natural gas fields in Poland